"Time" is a song released in 1981 as a single by the Alan Parsons Project. It was from their 1980 album The Turn of a Friendly Card. In the U.S., the song peaked at No. 15 on the Billboard Hot 100. On the U.S. Adult Contemporary chart, "Time" peaked at #10.  In addition, "Time" spent two weeks at #14 on Cash Box, making it the group's second most successful single ("Don't Answer Me" from 1984 also reached No. 15 on the Hot 100, but reached No. 17 on Cash Box).  Cash Box ranked it as the 94th biggest hit of 1981.  Outside the US, the song peaked at #30 in Canada.

The song was the first Alan Parsons Project song (and single) to feature Eric Woolfson as lead vocalist, and one of the group's few songs in which Alan Parsons's own voice can be heard singing (background/counterpoint vocals).

Chart history

Weekly charts

Year-end charts

References

External links
 

1980 songs
1981 singles
1980s ballads
The Alan Parsons Project songs
Arista Records singles
Rock ballads
Song recordings produced by Alan Parsons
Songs written by Alan Parsons
Songs written by Eric Woolfson